Kei Ogura (Ogura Kei, 小椋佳, born January 18, 1944, in Ueno, Taito, Tokyo, Japan) is a Japanese singer, songwriter and composer. He was also a bank clerk of Dai-Ichi Kangyo Bank, after graduation from the University of Tokyo. His musical career was in parallel with banking activity.

His major works include Saraba seishun (さらば青春) and Oretachi-no-tabi (俺たちの旅). He is known for offering his work to other singers.

Works

Ogura's original song 
Saraba seisyun (さらば青春)
Hikari no Hashi wo Koete (光の橋を越えて)
Tabidachi no Jokyoku (旅立ちの序曲)
Kansou no Uta (歓送の歌)
Uchuu no Kakehashi (宇宙の掛け橋)

Works performed by other singers
Oretachi-no-tabi (俺たちの旅) (singer: Masatoshi Nakamura)
Cyclamen no kahori (シクラメンのかほり) (singer: Akira Fuse)
Yumeshibai (夢芝居) (singer: Tomio Umezawa)
Aisansan (愛燦燦) (singer: Hibari Misora)
Tokigusuri (時薬) (singer: Daigoro Tachibana)

External links 
official web site of Kei Ogura(Japanese)

1944 births
Living people
Japanese male singer-songwriters
Japanese singer-songwriters